Stephanie Fey, who also publishes under the names Rebecca Abe, Stephanie Schuster and Ida Ding, (born 1967, in Starnberg) is a German writer and illustrator.

Biography
Stephanie Fey studied Graphic design in Munich, and she has illustrated several school and children's books. Her first published illustrations were for an edition of Heidi by Johanna Spyri.

Works

As Rebecca Abe 
 Das Gedächtnis der Lüge. Skalding Verlag, 2008 
 Im Labyrinth der Fugger. Gmeiner-Verlag 2011

As Stephanie Fey 
 Die Gesichtslosen, 2011
 Die Verstummten, 2013
 Die Zerrissenen, 2015

As Ida Ding 
 Hendlmord, 2015
 Jungfernfahrt, 2015

As Stephanie Schuster 
 Der Augenblick der Zeit, 2018

Anthologies:
 24 Geschichten zur Winterzeit. Esslinger Verlag, 2009

References

External links

  Persönliche Website
 

1967 births
Living people
People from Starnberg
Writers from Bavaria
German illustrators
German women illustrators
German women children's writers